The Rehabilitation Hospital of Rhode Island (also known as Fogarty Hospital) is a private rehabilitation hospital at 116 Eddie Dowling Highway (Route 146A) in the Park Square area of North Smithfield, Rhode Island and with another unit, Landmark Medical Center in Woonsocket, Rhode Island. The Rehabilitation Hospital "is the only free-standing hospital in Rhode Island devoted exclusively to inpatient and outpatient rehabilitation" and provides treatment for "acute illness, traumatic injury, major surgery or life-altering disease."

History
The John E. Fogarty Memorial Hospital in North Smithfield was built in 1965 and named after U.S. Congressman John E. Fogarty. In 1988 Fogarty Hospital of North Smithfield merged with Landmark Hospital of Woonosocket to become of the Fogarty Unit of Landmark Medical Center. In 2013 Prime Healthcare Services acquired the hospital.

References

External links

Hospitals in Rhode Island
1988 establishments in Rhode Island
Hospitals established in 1988
North Smithfield, Rhode Island
Rehabilitation hospitals